Van Tran Flat Bridge, also known as the The Motts Flats Bridge and The Livingston Manor Covered Bridge, is a wooden covered bridge that crosses Willowemoc Creek in the town of Rockland, in Sullivan County, New York.  The bridge was built in 1860 by John Davidson and features a Town lattice truss and a laminated arch system. The bridge was abandoned in 1972 and restored in 1984. The bridge is 103 feet long and leads to Livingston Manor Covered Bridge County Park.

History 
The Van Tran Flat Bridge (originally named The Motts Flats Bridge and later referred to as The Livingston Manor Covered Bridge) was first constructed in 1860 by John Davidson to cross the Willowemoc Creek located in the town of Rockland, in Sullivan County, New York. The bridge was constructed from timber and followed a similar design to other bridges in the Catskill region. The Van Tran Flat Bridge was constructed 5 years before the Beaverkill Covered Bridge, also built by John Davidson; thus making The Van Tran Flat Bridge the oldest of the 4 covered bridge in Sullivan County.

Sometime after 1958, the original dry-laid stone abutments were refaced with concrete. In 1972, the bridge was closed and formally abandoned. In 1984, the Sullivan County’s Department of Public Works alongside Milton S. Graton began restoring the bridge. The restoration project involved the use of original construction techniques and required replacing the truss, chords, floor, roof, and treenails. In November 1985, the bridge was reopened.

Associated Locations

John Mott Homestead 
Located on the road adjacent to the bridge is the original homestead of Dr. John Mott, Noble Peace Prize laureate and a founding member of the YMCA. The original name 'The Motts Flats Bridge' came from its association with the Mott family who owned the surrounding land.

Livingston Manor Covered Bridge County Park 
Adjacent to the Van Tran Flat Bridge is The Livingston Manor Covered Bridge Park, a park named after the bridge.

See also
 List of covered bridges in New York
 Bendo Bridge

References

External links
 Van Tran Flat Bridge, at New York State Covered Bridge Society
 Van Tran Flat Bridge, at Covered Bridges of the Northeast USA

Covered bridges in New York (state)
Bridges completed in 1860
Wooden bridges in New York (state)
Bridges in Sullivan County, New York
Tourist attractions in Sullivan County, New York
Road bridges in New York (state)